Rineloricaria teffeana is a species of catfish in the family Loricariidae. It is native to South America, where it occurs in the Amazon River basin in Brazil, with its type locality being listed as presumably near Tefé. The species reaches 14 cm (5.5 inches) in standard length and is believed to be a facultative air-breather.

References 

Loricariini

Fish described in 1879
Catfish of South America
Taxa named by Franz Steindachner
Freshwater fish of Brazil